Chèvreville is a former commune in the Manche department in Normandy in north-western France. On 1 January 2016, it was merged into the new commune of Grandparigny.

See also
Communes of the Manche department

References 

Former communes of Manche